Jan Tore Ophaug (born 25 March 1977) is a Norwegian former footballer.

In 2020 he became the manager of Råde IL.

References

External links
 OB profile 
Career statistics at DR
 Guardian Football

1977 births
Living people
People from Orkdal
Norwegian footballers
Association football defenders
Moss FK players
SK Brann players
Odense Boldklub players
Norwegian expatriate footballers
Expatriate men's footballers in Denmark
Norwegian expatriate sportspeople in Denmark
Fredrikstad FK players
Eliteserien players
Sportspeople from Trøndelag